Grant Faulkner is an American writer, the executive director of National Novel Writing Month (NaNoWriMo), the co-founder of the online literary journal 100 Word Story, and the co-host of the podcast Write-minded.

Biography 

Grant Faulkner was born and raised in Oskaloosa, Iowa. He earned a B.A. in English from Grinnell College and an M.A. in creative writing from San Francisco State University. He lives in Berkeley, California, with his wife, the writer Heather Mackey, and their two children.

In 2011, Faulkner and Lynn Mundell co-founded 100 Word Story, an online literary journal that publishes stories that are exactly 100 words long. Stories published in 100 Word Story have been included on Wigleaf’s Top (Very) Short Fictions list and anthologized in the annual Best Small Fictions series and W.W Norton's New Micro: Exceptionally Short Fiction.

In 2012, he became executive director of National Novel Writing Month (NaNoWriMo), taking over from founder Chris Baty. With more than 500,000 writers signing up to take part in NaNoWriMo’s programs annually, it's the largest writing event in the world.

NaNoWriMo emphasizes that everyone has a story to tell, and that everyone’s story matters. “Humans are naturally wired to tell stories because that’s how we make meaning of the world,” Faulkner said. “So everyone has a story—or many stories—to tell. Everyone is a creative type by definition.”

In 2014, Faulkner co-founded the Flash Fiction Collective, a reading series in San Francisco, with writers Jane Ciabattari and Meg Pokrass. Kristen Chen joined the trio in 2015.

In 2018, Faulkner launched the podcast "Write-minded: Weekly Inspiration for Writers" with co-host Brooke Warner of SheWrites.com.

Literary work 

Faulkner’s stories and essays have appeared in dozens of publications, including The New York Times, Poets & Writers, Writer’s Digest, Lit Hub, Tin House, The Southwest Review, The Gettysburg Review, Five Points, Green Mountains Review, and Puerto del Sol. His stories have also been anthologized in W.W. Norton’s New Micro: Especially Short Fiction, Best Small Fictions 2016, and Bloomsbury’s Short-Form Creative Writing, among others.

In 2015, Faulkner released Fissures, a collection of one hundred 100-word stories, published by Press 53.

One reviewer wrote, “In Grant Faulkner’s collection of very short fiction, Fissures [One Hundred 100-Word Stories], Faulkner manages to elevate his language, presenting each word here with the rhetorical weight of a novel and with a poetic aptitude that is anything but self-indulgent. Faulkner has, instead, carefully crafted these stories, and each word comes at the reader as high currency.”

The 100-word story form is often likened to prose poetry, which is one thing that drew Faulkner to the form. “I’ve always liked forms that blur,” he said. “To say that a piece of writing is a prose poem versus a story is just a matter of an author’s intention, an author’s definition.” In 2018, he co-edited a collection of the best stories published in 100 Word Story, Nothing Short of 100: Selected Tales from 100 Word Story with Lynn Mundell and Beret Olsen.

Faulkner is also known for his writings on the creative process. In 2017, Faulkner published Pep Talks for Writers: 52 Insights and Actions to Boost Your Creative Mojo. In 2019, he co-authored Brave the Page, a teen writing guide. His book on flash fiction, The Art of Brevity, is forthcoming in 2023.

Faulkner regularly presents at conferences, including the Frankfurt Book Fair, Book Expo America, the Bay Area Book Festival, the Oakland Book Festival, Litquake, the Writer’s Digest Conference, and the San Francisco Writers Conference, among others.

List of works

Books 

 All the Comfort Sin Can Provide
 Brave the Page: A Young Writers Guide to Telling Epic Stories
 Nothing Short of 100: Selected Tales from 100 Word Story
 Pep Talks for Writers: 52 Insights and Actions to Boost Your Creative Mojo
Fissures

Selected short stories 
 "Charms" - Fiction Southeast
 "First Time" - New Flash Fiction Review
 "Us" - decomP
 "Six Stories About Gerard and Celeste" - Paragraph Magazine
 "Bright Mess" - Superstition Review
 "Bodies at Risk in Motion" - Green Mountains Review
 "Castings" - Counterexample Poetics
 "Dear X" - Flash Flood
 "Filter" - The Cortland Review
 "The Filmmaker: Eight Takes" - Eclectica
 "Model Upside Down on the Stairs" - PANK
 "Life Knowledge" - Revolver
 "The Names of All Things" - The Southwest Review

Essays 

 13 Ways of Looking at Flash Fiction– Lit Hub
 "Life By the Bay: A Moveable Feast That Moved When I Wasn’t Looking" Lit Hub 
 Rejection’s Gift: Divine Dissatisfaction– Poets & Writers
 Imagination Under Pressure – Poets & Writers
 The Art of Seduction: How to Entice and Captivate Your Readers – Writer’s Digest
 One Hundred Reasons Why I Write - National Writing Project
 Naked (On the Page) and Afraid - Writer’s Digest
 Writing Flash Fiction: Telling a Story with What’s Left Out - Writer’s Digest
 More Ideas Faster: Writing With Abandon - Poets & Writers
 Going Long. Going Short. - New York Times Draft Blog
 What Makes NaNoWriMo Work: Breaking Down the Mythology of the Solitary Writer - Writer’s Digest

Selected interviews 

 A Salve for Our General Malaise: Grant Faulkner Interviewed by Taylor Larsen-Bomb Magazine 
 All the Comfort Sin Provides– First Draft
 "Stories That Matter”– The Nob Hill Gazette
 "Shards and Gems": An Interview With Guest Reader Grant Faulkner - Smokelong Quarterly
 The Writer's Digest Podcast, Episode 8: Interview with NaNoWriMo Executive Director Grant Faulkner - Writer's Digest
 A Flash Fiction Roundtable: Short but Never Small - Millions
 An Interview with Grant Faulkner - Superstition Review
 An Interview with Grant Faulkner, author of Fissures - Fiction Southeast
 The Write Stuff: Grant Faulkner on Watching Objects Rust and the Slow Reveal - SF Weekly’s Litseen
 How could creative expression not change the world? Interview with Grant Faulkner - Art Is Moving
 Grant Faulkner: A Modern Day Pioneer Inspiring Creativity Through Writing – Unzpipped
 An Interview with NaNoWriMo’s New Executive Director – NaNoWriMo blog

References

External links 
 
 Grant Faulkner on Twitter
 National Novel Writing Month
 100 Word Story
 Flash Fiction Collective
 Grant Faulkner on Substack

People from Oskaloosa, Iowa
Grinnell College alumni
San Francisco State University alumni
Year of birth missing (living people)
Living people
American male writers
21st-century American writers